Navra Maza Navsacha (Marathi: नवरा माझा नवसाचा) is a 2004 Marathi film. The film stars Sachin Pilgaonkar, Ashok Saraf and Supriya Pilgaonkar in leading roles. The movie portrays the journey of the couple from Mumbai to Ganapatipule to fulfill a vow. 

The plot of the movie is based on the 1972 Hindi film Bombay to Goa, which itself was a remake of 1966 Tamil Film Madras to Pondicherry.

Plot 

Vakratund (Sachin Pilgaonkar) and Bhakti (Supriya Pilgaonkar) are a couple who have married against Bhakti's parents wishes. Vakratund, also known as Vacky, is an artist but does not have commercial success. Even after 10 years of marriage, the couple is not blessed with children. Bhakti gets to know from Vacky's aunt (Nirmiti Sawant) that Vacky's father had vowed to God that if his child is born healthy, he will bring his child to Ganapati Pule naked. This vow was left unfulfilled as Vacky's parents passed away soon. Bhakti tries to persuade Vacky to go to Ganpati Pule naked, but he does not agree to it. Vacky and his friend Kishore (Atul Parchure) then hire a small time actor (Satish Tare) as a sage, who advises them to take a mannequin dressed as Vacky secretly in a public transport to Ganapti Pule to fulfill the vow. Vacky and his friend Kishore manage to sneak the mannequin into a state transport bus the previous night of the travel to Ganapati Pule. However, they are unaware that after their departure from the bus at night, an international smuggler named Babu Kaalia (Pradeep Patwardhan) who has just escaped from prison and has stolen diamonds worth 80 crore entered the bus and hid the bag filled with diamonds in a hollow of the mannequin.

Hilarity ensues as the remaining story has the highs and the lows that the couple face while travelling in the bus and the different lives of the passengers, including the bus conductor Lalu (Ashok Saraf) and the bus driver Prasad (Sunil Tawde). However, on reaching Ganpati Pule, they and the passengers are confronted by police as they have an evidence that Babu Kaalia is travelling in the bus to flee to Dubai from Ganpati Pule port. The whole time in the bus from Mumbai to Ganpati Pule, Vacky was drawing the portrait of Babu Kaalia with the help of a fellow passenger (Jaywant Wadkar) who knew Babu Kalia. As soon as they complete the sketch, Babu Kaalia springs up to his true identity and threatens Vicky and passengers for his diamonds or to kill them all. However, Bhakti asks Vicky to take the mannequin to the temple. Vacky reveals that the sage Bhakti met was fake and he had planned this to avoid going naked to Ganpati Pule. However, Vacky still takes away the mannequin to the temple while others run behind him tearing his clothes. By the time he reaches the temple he is completely naked. He completes the vow and the couple are rewarded with 8 crore for catching the gangster and they live happily thereafter.

Cast 

 Sachin Pilgaonkar as Vakratund Deshpande (Vacky)
 Supriya Pilgaonkar as Bhakti Vakratund Deshpande
 Ashok Saraf as Bus Conductor Lalu
 Vijay Patkar as Undercover Cop
 Ali Asgar as Film Director
 Reema Lagoo as Sheila Raje (Guest Appearance)
 Sonu Nigam as himself (Guest Appearance)
 Johny Lever as Nepali Passenger (Guest Appearance)
 Pradeep Patwardhan as Smuggler Babu Kaalia 
 Kuldeep Pawar as Police Inspector
 Nirmiti Sawant as Aatya (Vacky's aunt)
 Kishori Shahane as Dancer Shevanta (Guest Appearance)
 Atul Parchure as Kishore (Vacky's friend) 
 Jaywant Wadkar as Snoring passenger
 Vikas Samudre as Chiplun passenger
 Satish Tare as Ughade Baba (Kishore's actor friend) 
 Sunil Tawde as Bus Driver Prasad
 Madhurani Gokhale-Prabhulkar as Video Jockey Candy
 Pradeep Kabre as Tamasha group owner
 Vicky Dhaiphule as passenger without Helmet
 Vaibhav Mangle as passenger with Helmet
 Shefali Soman as Mandakini

Soundtrack

Remakes
The film was remade in Kannada as Ekadantha starring Vishnuvardhan, Prema and Ramesh Aravind in the lead roles.

References

External links
 

2004 films
Marathi films remade in other languages
Marathi remakes of Tamil films
Marathi remakes of Hindi films
Films directed by Sachin (actor)
2000s Marathi-language films